Paul Raymond Hudak (July 15, 1952 – April 29, 2015) was an American musician and professor of computer science at Yale University who was best known for his involvement in the design of the Haskell programming language, as well as several textbooks on Haskell and computer music. He was a chair of the department, and was also master of Saybrook College. He died on April 29, 2015, of leukemia.

References

External links 
 Official Home Page
 Curriculum Vitae

1952 births
2015 deaths
American computer scientists
Functional programming
Programming language researchers
Vanderbilt University alumni
Massachusetts Institute of Technology alumni
University of Utah alumni
Yale University faculty
Academic journal editors
Computer science writers
American textbook writers
American male non-fiction writers
Fellows of the Association for Computing Machinery
Deaths from leukemia